Asak (also Romanized as Āsak and Ās-e Bād) is a village in Qorqori Rural District, Qorqori District, Hirmand County, Sistan and Baluchestan Province, Iran. At the 2006 census, its population was 191, in 42 families.

References 

Populated places in Hirmand County